Puerto Suárez International Airport , also known as Capitán Av. Salvador Ogaya G. Airport, is an airport serving Puerto Suárez, a city in the Santa Cruz Department of Bolivia. The airport is in the easternmost part of Bolivia, near the border with Brazil.

The Puerto Suarez non-directional beacon (Ident: PSZ) is located on the field.

Airlines and destinations

See also
Transport in Bolivia
List of airports in Bolivia

References

External links
Puerto Suárez Airport at OpenStreetMap
Puerto Suárez Airport at OurAirports

Airports in Santa Cruz Department (Bolivia)